Spike is an email application for Windows, MacOS, iOS, Android and the web, which enables users to view email in a chat-like, conversational format, with additional features built-in.

History
Founded in 2013 by Erez Pilosof and Dvir Ben-Aroya, Spike is a software application that puts existing e-mails into a multimedia messaging, chat-like interface enhanced with video and voice calls. The application was initially named Hop.

In 2019, the developers completed a $5 million funding round  including investment from Wix.com and NFX Capital.

In 2021 Spike announced a collaboration with Meta to launch on the Oculus Store and would become one of the first productivity apps to launch in Meta's new virtual world, known as the Metaverse.

Mode of use
The app enables users to organize email into three types of “conversations,” a traditional inbox/sent format, by subject, or by people. Spike users can also make audio and video calls to each other, and other features include a calendar, contact list, and Groups.

Spike is available for Microsoft Windows, MacOS, iOS and Android, and as a web version, and works with Gmail, Outlook, Exchange, iCloud, Yahoo! Mail and IMAP email providers.

References

iOS software
Email clients
Android (operating system) software
Web applications
Windows software